Thomas or Tom McCormick is the name of:

Tom McCormick (American football) (1930–2012), American football player
Tom McCormick (boxer) (1890–1916), British boxer
Tom McCormick (politician) (1926–2022), American politician
Thomas J. McCormick (1933–2020), American academic

See also
 Tom McCormack (disambiguation)